Antipterna acrobaphes is a species of moth in the family Oecophoridae, first described by Edward Meyrick in 1885 as Ocystola acrobaphes. The holotype was collected in Sydney, New South Wales, in January 1878.

Meyrick's description

Further reading

References

Oecophorinae
Taxa described in 1885
Taxa named by Edward Meyrick